Bettyhill  is a village in the parish of Farr, on the north coast of Scotland.

Bettyhill's principal attractions are the expanse of Torrisdale Bay, the Strathnaver Museum and salmon fishing on the River Naver. The Strathnaver Museum, probably better known as "The Mackay Museum", has an upstairs, older & larger section devoted to the ancient Clan Mackay. The whole of the north-western highlands (Assynt to Cape Wrath, Loch Shin to Strath Halladale and Reay) was known as "Mackay Country" from the 13th century.

Adjoining Farr High School is the North Coast Leisure Centre which comprises a leisure pool, gym, spa and sauna and is open for public use. The craft shop serves fish and chips on a Friday and Saturday night, as well as having a cafe ('The Cafe at Bettyhill') which is currently open seven days a week during summer months. There are several lovely empty beaches nearby. The Bettyhill Hotel contains the Eilean Neave restaurant. The Farr Bay Inn, built in 1819, was formerly the manse and is now a listed building. It has recently come under new management and was refurbished in 2009.

Bettyhill holds an annual football competition called the Guy Cup. Teams from nearby northern areas come to compete for the trophy. This annual gathering is held in remembrance of Philip Mackay (nicknamed "Guy") who died in an oil rig accident. The medals and trophy are usually held by Guy's mother Phyllis Mackay.

References

External links 

Populated places in Sutherland
Bettyhill